Nicolas Kocik (born 4 August 1998) is a French professional footballer who plays as a goalkeeper for  club Le Mans.

Club career
Kocik made his professional debut with Valenciennes in a 4–1 Coupe de la Ligue loss to Ajaccio on 13 August 2019.

On 5 July 2022, Kocik returned to Le Mans.

Personal life
Kocik's grandfather, Bolec Kocik, was also a professional football player and manager of Polish descent.

References

External links
 
 
 

1998 births
Living people
People from Maubeuge
Association football goalkeepers
French footballers
France youth international footballers
French people of Polish descent
Valenciennes FC players
Le Mans FC players
SO Cholet players
Championnat National 3 players
Championnat National players
Ligue 2 players
Sportspeople from Nord (French department)
Footballers from Hauts-de-France